Trifid Peak is a peak at the head of Shoesmith Glacier in western Horseshoe Island. Named by United Kingdom Antarctic Place-Names Committee (UK-APC) in 1958. The name is descriptive of this three-sided matterhorn-type peak.

Mountains of Graham Land
Fallières Coast